Swollen was the debut album of Hetch Hetchy, released in 1990 by Texas Hotel Records.

Track listing

Personnel 
Hetch Hetchy
Lynda Stipe – vocals, bass guitar, keyboards
Jay Totty – guitar, bass guitar, backing vocals

Production and additional personnel
Hahn Rowe – production
Tim Sommer – production

Release history

References

External links 
 

1990 debut albums
Texas Hotel Records albums
Hetch Hetchy (band) albums
Albums produced by Hahn Rowe
Albums produced by Tim Sommer